The Norfolk Nighthawks are a now-defunct charter member of the AF2.  They played their home games at The Norfolk Scope Arena in Norfolk, Virginia.  After a very impressive inaugural season, the Nighthawks never made it back to the playoffs and ceased all operations after the 2003 Af2 season. The Nighthawks coaches were: Deatrich Wise (2000-01), Mike Buck (2002), and Rick Frazier (2003). The assistant coaches were: Ron Hill, Offensive Coordinator, Ed Cunningham, Line coach, Keith Easley, Defence and Quality Control. The primary owners were Kenny Easley, Jr. (2000-03) and Bruce Smith (2000-03). Billy Mann served the team as General Manager, Patricia Easley and Adianna Manzella were the front office leaders. Corporate Sales was covered by Don Mears, Sr.

Season-by-season 

|-
|2000 || 11 || 7 || 0 || 2nd AC || Won Round 1 (Norfolk 41, Jacksonville 28) Lost Semifinals (Quad City  75, Norfolk 27)
|-
|2001 || 8 || 8 || 0 || 3rd AC Northeast || --
|-
|2002 || 8 || 8 || 0 || 3rd AC Atlantic || --
|-
|2003 || 8 || 8 || 0 || 3rd AC Atlantic || --
|-
!Totals || 35 || 31 || 0
|colspan="2"| (including playoffs)
|}

Season-By-Season
 Norfolk Nighthawks on ArenaFan.com

References

American football teams in Virginia
Defunct af2 teams
Sports in Norfolk, Virginia
American football teams established in 1999
American football teams disestablished in 2003
1999 establishments in Virginia
2003 disestablishments in Virginia